Live in Vancouver 1970 is a two-disc live album by the American rock band the Doors. It was recorded at the Pacific Coliseum in Vancouver, British Columbia, on June 6, 1970. The band were joined by guitar legend Albert King on four songs; Willie Dixon’s "Little Red Rooster", the Motown classic "Money" and the blues standards "Rock Me" and "Who Do You Love?".

The concert was four months into the band's 1970 Roadhouse Blues Tour. Vince Treanor, the Doors’ tour manager, recorded the show for the band on a Sony reel-to-reel machine using two microphones placed on the stage. While not a multi track high fidelity recording, it is a clean, quiet and clear recording.

Release and reception

The album was released from the Bright Midnight Archives collection which contains a number of previously unreleased live concerts by the Doors. Ray Manzarek, the Doors' keyboardist recalled the concert as "A large audience, lights shining in my eyes, can't see the audience... The Doors are excited because Albert King is coming onstage, so we played great. Then Albert comes on, and we played even better. We played dark and deep and funky. Morrison was just transfixed by Albert King's manual dexterity and adroitness on the guitar, so he was in blues-boy heaven."

Track listing

Personnel
Jim Morrison – vocals
Ray Manzarek – organ, keyboard bass
Robby Krieger – guitar, slide guitar
John Densmore – drums

Additional musicians
Albert King – guitar on "Little Red Rooster", "Money", "Rock Me", "Who Do You Love"

References

2010 compilation albums
2010 live albums
Albums produced by Bruce Botnick
Bright Midnight Archives